The Green Bay Gamblers are a Tier I junior ice hockey team in the Eastern Conference of the United States Hockey League (USHL). They play in Ashwaubenon, Wisconsin, at the Resch Center.

History

Professional hockey in Green Bay
The first professional hockey team to be based in Green Bay was the Green Bay Bobcats who started playing in 1958 when the Brown County Veterans Memorial Arena was built. There is some confusion over what league the team played in during its early years or if the team played in multiple leagues. Some sources cite that the Bobcats played in the U.S. Central Hockey League, a predecessor to the current United States Hockey League (USHL). Other sources claim that the Bobcats did not start playing in the USCHL until 1961. The Green Bay Bobcats franchise folded after the 1980-1981 season and 23 years of play. However, since the 2008-2009 season, the Green Bay Gamblers have used a yellow bobcat prominently in the team's logo as well as having a bobcat by the name of "Ace" as the teams mascot.

Green Bay Gamblers

Since their inception into the United States Hockey League in 1994, the Green Bay Gamblers have been one of the premiere junior "A" hockey franchises in all of North America. To their credit the Gamblers have won two Junior A, Tier 2 National Championships (Gold Cups in 1996 and 1997), five Anderson Cups (1996, 1997, 2009, 2010, and 2012), four Clark Cups (1996, 2000, 2010, and 2012), four USHL Eastern Division titles, and one USHL Northern Division title. Since the USHL became Tier 1 in 2002, the Clark Cup also represents that level's national championship.

Home rinks
From when the Gamblers entered the league at the start of the 1994-1995 season through the 2001-2002 season, the team's primary venue was at the Brown County Veterans Memorial Arena.  For the start of the 2002-2003 season, the Gamblers moved into the Resch Center, an 8,800 seat arena which was built on the opposite side of Shopko Hall.  The team played at the Memorial Arena a few times each season due to scheduling conflicts with the Resch Center until the arena was scheduled for demolition in 2019.

During the years at the Arena, other venues were sometimes used due to scheduling conflicts.  These include the De Pere Ice & Recreation Center, the Brown County Youth Hockey Arena, the Cornerstone Community Center, Fond du Lac's Blue Line Ice Center, Beaver Dam Ice Arena, Greenheck Ice Center in Schofield.

Since 1994 the average attendance of a Gamblers Game is 3,353 people, which is among the top in the USHL. In 2010, the Green Bay Gamblers set a USHL record for the highest attended playoff game when 8,487 fans showed up to see game five of the USHL Playoff championship, a game the Gamblers won resulting in franchise's third Clark Cup. The record has since been broken multiple times.

Season-by-season record 
Reference

Note: GP = Games played, W = Wins, L = Losses, T = Ties, OTL = Overtime losses, Pts = Points, GF = Goals for, GA = Goals against, PIM = Penalties in minutes

Players

Current roster
As of March 15, 2023.

|}

Team captains

Notable alumni

NHL 

On March 25, 2013, former Gamblers head coach Jon Cooper was named the head coach of the Tampa Bay Lightning. He is the first USHL coaching alumnus to lead an NHL team. Former Gamblers head coach Derek Lalonde was hired by the Lightning as an assistant coach on July 12, 2018, joining Cooper's staff.

On June 30, 2022, the Detroit Red Wings hired LaLonde as its head coach.

NHL draft picks
Green Bay Gamblers have had the following players selected in the NHL draft.

Olympics 
Maris Ziedens appeared in the 2006 Winter Olympics for his native Latvia. Latvia finished 12th.

Blake Wheeler was selected to the United States national team for the 2014 Winter Olympics. They finished 4th.

Markus Lauridsen appeared in the 2022 games in Beijing for Denmark.

NCAA champions 
Gamblers alumni have played on multiple NCAA men's hockey national champions teams:

2022
Denver University
David Carle, head coach
Matt Davis 
McCade Webster

Statistical leaders

Head coaches
Don Granato (1994–97)
Mark Osiecki (1997–2004)
Mark Mazzoleni (2004-2008)
Dave Insalaco (2008) (interim)
Jon Cooper (2008–2010)
Eric Rud (2010–11)
Derek Lalonde (2011–2014)
Pat Mikesch (2014–2022)
Michael Leone (2022-present)

References

External links
Green Bay Gamblers Official Website

Amateur ice hockey teams in Wisconsin
Sports in Green Bay, Wisconsin
United States Hockey League teams
1994 establishments in Wisconsin
Ice hockey clubs established in 1994